Money Mad is a 1908 American short crime film directed by  D. W. Griffith. It is based on the short story "Just Meat" by Jack London.

Cast
 Charles Inslee - The Miser
 George Gebhardt - Second Villain
 Arthur V. Johnson - Bank Clerk
 Florence Lawrence - Bank Customer / Landlady
 Jeanie MacPherson - Bank Customer
 Mack Sennett - Man on the Street
 Harry Solter - First Villain

See also
 List of American films of 1908
 1908 in film
 D. W. Griffith filmography

References

External links

Money Mad available for free download at Internet Archive

1908 films
Films directed by D. W. Griffith
American silent short films
1900s crime films
American black-and-white films
Articles containing video clips
Films based on works by Jack London
American crime films
Surviving American silent films
1900s American films